George Leitch "Dod" Gray (12 April 1909 – 2 September 1975) was a Scottish rugby union, and professional rugby league footballer who played in the 1930s, who played at hooker, i.e. number 2.

Rugby union
He also played for Gala RFC.

Rugby league
Gray changed rugby football codes from rugby union to rugby league when he transferred to Huddersfield RLFC in 1937–38, and also played for the Other Nationalities rugby league team.

References

 Bath, Richard (ed.) The Scotland Rugby Miscellany (Vision Sports Publishing Ltd, 2007 )

External links
Statistics at espnscrum.com

1909 births
1975 deaths
Dual-code rugby internationals
Gala RFC players
Huddersfield Giants players
Other Nationalities rugby league team players
Rugby league players from Galashiels
Rugby union players from Galashiels
Rugby articles needing expert attention
Scotland international rugby union players
Scottish rugby league players
Scottish rugby union players